The Oberliga Nordrhein was the highest Football League in the region of Nordrhein which is part of the state of North Rhine-Westphalia from 1978 to 2008. In its last season, it was  one of nine Oberligas in German football, the 4th tier of the German football league system. In 2008, it was replaced by the NRW-Liga (Oberliga Nordrhein-Westfalen), a new statewide league.

Overview
The league was formed in 1978 as a highest level of play for the two regions of Mittelrhein and Niederrhein, which cover the western half of the state of Nordrhein-Westfalen. The main reason for the creation of this league was to allow its champion direct promotion to the 2nd Bundesliga Nord rather than having to go through a promotion play-off. It was created from nine clubs from the Verbandsliga Mittelrhein and seven clubs from the Verbandsliga Niederrhein which remained as the leagues below the Oberliga. Additionally, two teams from the 2nd Bundesliga were relegated to the new league, bringing the initial number of teams to eighteen.

Originally, the league was called Amateur Oberliga Nordrhein, from 1994 this was shortened to just Oberliga Nordrhein.

With the introduction of the unified 2nd Bundesliga in 1981, direct promotion for the Oberliga champions became impossible again because there were eight of them competing for four promotion spots. The champion of the Oberliga Nordrhein had to compete with the winners of the Oberligas Nord, Berlin and Westfalen for two 2nd Bundesliga spots.

Upon creation of the Regionalligas in 1994, the champions of the Oberligas were directly promoted again, however the Oberligas slipped to fourth tier in the German football league system. The top six teams in the Oberliga that year were qualified for the new Regionalliga West/Südwest, however, the champion, Fortuna Düsseldorf, won promotion to the 2nd Bundesliga and Bayer Leverkusen II declined, therefore only four teams went to the Regionalliga, the clubs being:

Alemannia Aachen
SC Brück, merged with Viktoria Köln in 1994 to form Preußen Köln.
1. FC Bocholt
Bonner SC

Additionally to those four clubs, two teams from the Nordrhein region were relegated from the 2nd Bundesliga in 1994, entering the Regionalliga as well, these being the Wuppertaler SV and the Rot-Weiß Essen.

With the reduction of the number of Regionalligas from four to two in 2000, the Oberliga Nordrhein was now located below the Regionalliga Nord.

With the creation of the 3rd Liga in 2008 the Oberliga Nordrhein was replaced by the Oberliga Nordrhein-Westfalen, which now is the fifth tier of the league system. The Oberliga Nordrhein ceased to exit after 30 seasons. Its clubs were split up over three league levels. The first four teams were promoted to the new Regionalliga West, clubs from place five to eleven went to the new Oberliga while the bottom seven teams were relegated to the Verbandsligas.

The last round of games to be played in the league was on 18 May 2008.

Throughout the league's existence the two leagues below the Oberliga were:

Verbandsliga Niederrhein
Verbandsliga Mittelrhein

The Schwarz-Weiß Essen is the only club to have played all 30 seasons in the league.

Champions of the Oberliga Nordrhein
The league champions:

In its 30-year history, three clubs managed to win the league three times, Wuppertaler SV, Rot-Weiß Essen and Rot-Weiß Oberhausen.

Placings in the Oberliga Nordrhein 1978 to 2008 
The final placings in the league:

Notes
 1 FC Remscheid was formed as BV Lüttringhausen, changed its name to BVL Remscheid in 1985 and merged in 1990 with VfB Remscheid to form FCR.
 2 In 1994 Viktoria Köln merged with SC Brück to form Preußen Köln but reverted to its old name Viktoria in 2002.
 3 In 1996 SC Jülich 1910 withdrew from the league.
 4 In 1998 KFC Uerdingen II withdrew from the league.
 5 In 2004 Wuppertaler SV merged with Borussia Wuppertal to form Wuppertaler SV Borussia.
 6 In 2005 Adler Osterfeld withdrew from the league.

Key

Founding Members of the Oberliga Nordrhein
The Oberliga started in 1978 with 18 clubs from two regions and the 2. Bundesliga.

From the 2. Bundesliga Nord:
1. FC Bocholt
Schwarz-Weiß Essen

From the Verbandsliga Niederrhein:
Olympia Bocholt
Rot-Weiß Oberhausen
VfB Remscheid
TuS Xanten
1. FC Viersen
ASV Wuppertal
RSV Meerbeck

From the Verbandsliga Mittelrhein:
Viktoria Köln
SV Baesweiler 09
Bonner SC
1. FC Köln II
SC Jülich 1910
TuS Langerwehe
SV Siegburg 04
FC Niederembt
FV Bad Honnef
Borussia Brand

Disbanding of the league
At the end of the 2007-08 season, the Oberliga Nordrhein was disbanded and its clubs distributed to various leagues according to the season's final standings:

To the Regionalliga West:
 Borussia Mönchengladbach II
 Bayer 04 Leverkusen II
 1. FC Köln II
 1. FC Kleve

To the Oberliga Nordrhein-Westfalen:
 Schwarz-Weiß Essen
 SSVg Velbert
 MSV Duisburg II
 Germania Dattenfeld
 Alemannia Aachen II
 Bonner SC
 Fortuna Düsseldorf II

To the Verbandsliga Mittelrhein:
 SSG Bergisch Gladbach

To the Verbandsliga Niederrhein:
 Wuppertaler SV II
 VfB Homberg
 KFC Uerdingen 05
 TuRU Düsseldorf
 VfB Speldorf
 SV Straelen

References

Sources
 Deutschlands Fußball in Zahlen,  An annual publication with tables and results from the Bundesliga to Verbandsliga/Landesliga, publisher: DSFS
 Kicker Almanach,  The yearbook on German football from Bundesliga to Oberliga, since 1937, published by the Kicker Sports Magazine

External links 
 Das deutsche Fussball Archiv  Historic German league tables
 Niederrhein Football Association (FVN)  
 Mittelrhein Football Association (FVM)  

Nordrhein
Football competitions in North Rhine-Westphalia
1978 establishments in West Germany
2008 disestablishments in Germany
Sports leagues established in 1978
Sports leagues disestablished in 2008
Ger